Ernest Norman Hiskins (3 May 1918 - September 1972), a resident of Lichfield, Staffordshire, took part in the 1950 Monte Carlo Rally.

Career
On 25 January 1950, Ernest, the owner of Midland Auto Electric Co. of Trent Valley Trading Estate, began the 1956-mile long journey from Glasgow to Monaco as he took part in the Monte Carlo Rally. He drove a Hillman Minx to 70th place.

References

English rally drivers
1918 births
1972 deaths